Patalesvara Siva Temple – III (Hindi: पातालेश्वर शिव) is a Siva temple located on the Mandir Chowk of Old Town, Bhubaneswar, Orissa, India. The temple dates to the 13th century AD.

Location
Patalesvara Siva Temple – III is situated on the left side of the Lingaraja temple eastern gateway and it is situated on the Mandir Chowk of Old Town area in Bhubaneswar. The temple is facing towards east and the presiding deity is a circular yonipitha with a Siva-lingam. The temple is made of sandstone. The sanctum is 2.59 m below the present road level which is provided with seventeen steps leading down the sanctum.

Ownership
Single/Multiple: Multiple
Public/Private: Public

Property Type
Precinct/ Building/ Structure/Landscape/Site/Tank: Building

Subtype: Temple

Typology: Pidha Deul

Physical Description

Surrounding
The temple is surrounded by road in east, compound wall
of Lingaraja temple on its west at a distance of 1.85 m, and Mahakala and Mahakali temple on its southern side through the eastern gateway of Lingaraja temple at a distance of 55 m.

Physical Description
On plan, the temple has a vimana and a frontal porch measuring 3.50 m2. On elevation, the temple is buried up to the bada. Only the gandi is visible that measures 3.00 m in height and mastaka is 0.70 m
Raha niche & parsva devatas: Since the temple is buried up to the bada the raha niches are buried.
v) Decorative features: 
The doorjambs are decorated with three vertical bands that measure 1.55 m in height x 0.74 m in width. At the base of the doorjamb, there are two dvarapala niches measuring 0.36 m in height, 0.17 m in width, the enshrining deities of
these niches are Saivite Dvarapala holding a trident in left hand and the right hand is in varada mudra
Lintel: At the lalatabimba, there is a Gajalaxmi image seated in lalitasana over a lotus, The image is flanked by elephants, who are pouring water upon the deity.

Grade

References 

Shiva temples in Odisha
Hindu temples in Bhubaneswar
13th-century Hindu temples